U.S. Highway 89 (US 89) is a north-south United States Numbered Highway in the state of Montana. US 89 is an important tourist route within Montana as it connects Yellowstone National Park and Glacier National Park. The section of US 89 located between US 12 and US 87 is known as the Kings Hill Scenic Byway, which passes through the Little Belt Mountains in the Lewis and Clark National Forest, and is home to a wide variety of wildlife and provides many recreational opportunities for travelers along the route.

Route description

US 89 enters Montana at the North Entrance of Yellowstone National Park, on the southern edge of Gardiner at the Roosevelt Arch; it is one of two entrances opened year-round (the other being the Northeast entrance long US 212). Some commercially produced maps show US 89 going through Yellowstone National Park; however, it officially has a gap inside the park and resumes in Wyoming at the South Entrance. From US 12 the byway travels for  through the Lewis and Clark National Forest, through the communities of Neihart and Monarch, and on to its junction with US 87. The route offers access to the Showdown Ski Area and Sluice Boxes State Park. The route travels over the Kings Hill Pass which snow removal crews work to keep open throughout the winter season. 

As it travels through Great Falls along 10th Avenue South, US 87 branches north at 14th Street South, I-15 Business joins the route at 6th Street South, and it follows a short, unsigned concurrency with I-315 before reaching I-15. US 89 travels  to US 287 in Choteau and another  to US 2.

US 2 and US 89 share a  concurrency through Browning and at a roundabout on the western end of town, US 2 heads southwest towards East Glacier and provides an all-weather link to the western end of Glacier National Park. US 89 travels  to the Chief Mountain Highway (MT 17), a road that travels through the northeastern corner of Glacier National Park and provides seasonal access to Canada's Waterton Lakes National Park by way of the Chief Mountain Border Station and Quarters (the only road that connects Waterton-Glacier International Peace Park). US 89 travels  to its northern terminus at the Canadian border at Port of Piegan where the road continues into Alberta as Highway 2 towards Cardston.

History
When US 89 was first created, it ran as far north as Spanish Fork, Utah. This was the case until 1934, when it was extended to more or less of its current alignment up to the Port of Piegan. North of Great Falls, US 89's route was originally part of the US 87 corridor until 1934. US 87 ended in Great Falls until 1945, when it was extended to its current northern terminus near Havre.

Major intersections

See also

References

External links

 Highway 89 Route: Between the Parks

 Montana
89
Transportation in Park County, Montana
Transportation in Meagher County, Montana
Transportation in Cascade County, Montana
Transportation in Teton County, Montana
Transportation in Pondera County, Montana
Transportation in Glacier County, Montana